Yawan is one of the 28 districts of Badakhshan province in eastern Afghanistan. It was created in 2005 from part of the Ragh District and is home to approximately 36,037 residents.

See also
Ragh District

References

External links
Map at the Afghanistan Information Management Services

Districts of Badakhshan Province